Barbara "Bobbie" Handman (March 11, 1928 – November 14, 2013) was an American political consultant and arts activist, known for her role in preserving historic Broadway theater houses.  She was the executive vice-president and New York City office director of People for the American Way from 1981 until 2003.

Born in Philadelphia, Pennsylvania, Handman was the wife of stage director and teacher Wynn Handman. In 1982, she helped organize Save the Theatres, an organization that tried unsuccessfully to prevent the razing of the Morosco, Helen Hayes, and Bijou Theaters.  In 1988, the group succeeded in having 28 Broadway houses designated as landmarks by the New York City Board of Estimate.

Handman served on the board of the Eleanor Roosevelt Foundation and on the Franklin Delano Roosevelt Memorial Commission.

She was awarded the National Medal of Arts in 1998 for her work as an arts advocate.

Handman's daughter Laura Handman is married to Harold M. Ickes.

References

External links 
 PFAW tribute to Handman

1928 births
2013 deaths
American political consultants
People for the American Way people
United States National Medal of Arts recipients
Activists from Philadelphia